{{Infobox college basketball team
|current = 
|name = Metro State Roadrunners
|logo =
|logo_size = 200
|university = Metropolitan State University of Denver
|firstseason = 
|conference = Rocky Mountain Athletic Conference
|division =
|location = Denver, Colorado
|coach = 
|tenure = 
|arena = Auraria Event Center
|capacity = 2,300
|nickname = Roadrunners
|NCAAchampion = 2000, 2002
|NCAArunnerup = 1999, 2013
|NCAAfinalfour = 1999, 2000, 2002, 2004, 2013, 2014
|NCAAeliteeight = 1999, 2000, 2002, 2004, 2005, 2012, 2013, 2014
|NCAAsweetsixteen = 1998, 1999, 2000, 2002, 2003, 2004, 2005, 2012, 2013, 2014
|NCAAsecondround = 1998, 1999, 2000, 2002, 2003, 2004, 2005, 2012, 2013, 2014
|NCAAtourneys = 1990, 1991, 1998, 1999, 2000, 2001, 2002, 2003, 2004, 2005, 2006, 2007, 2009, 2010, 2011, 2012, 2013, 2014, 2015
|conference_tournament = Rocky Mountain Athletic Conference1999, 2000, 2001, 2003, 2004, 2005, 2007, 2009, 2010, 2013, 2014
|conference_season = Great Northwest Conference1990

Colorado Athletic Conference1991, 1992 

Rocky Mountain Athletic Conference1998, 2000, 2004, 2005, 2007, 2009, 2013, 2014, 2015 ''
}}

The Metro State men's basketball team, or Roadrunners''', represents Metropolitan State University of Denver in Denver, Colorado.

Postseason results

National Championships

Final Four history

Season-by-season results
Source:

NIT

Metro State was selected for the 2013 NIT Season Tip-Off, their opponent is the Rhode Island Rams. The regional is being played at the McKale Center in Tucson, AZ. Home of the Arizona Wildcats. Metro State became the second Division II team to be selected in the NIT Season Tip-Off.

|-
!colspan=9 | Exhibition

Metro State becomes first DII school to win twice at NIT Season Tip-Off

Roadrunners in the Pros

Active

Retired

Roadrunner Olympians

References